The 2018 NCAA Division I men's soccer season was the 60th season of NCAA championship men's college soccer.  The regular season began on August 24, 2018 and continued into the first weekend of November 2018. The season culminated with the four-team College Cup at Meredith Field at Harder Stadium in Santa Barbara, California, December 7–9, 2018. There were 206 teams in men's Division I competition. The Maryland Terrapins won their fourth NCAA title, defeating the Akron Zips 1–0.

Changes from 2017

Coaching changes

New programs 
Mount St. Mary's University reinstated their men's soccer program, which had been dormant since the end of the 2012 season, for the 2018 season.

The California Baptist Lancers began the transition from Division II to Division I and the Western Athletic Conference in 2018–19.

The UC San Diego Tritons will begin the transition from Division II to Division I and will join the Big West Conference in 2020–21.

The Merrimack Warriors will begin the transition from Division II to Division I and will join the Northeast Conference in 2019–20.

Discontinued programs 

Hartwick College, the only Division III school competing in Division I men's soccer for some years moved to Division III with the school's other sports.

Despite the program's many successes, the University of New Mexico's Board of Regents, for economic reasons, voted to discontinue the men's soccer program, along with three other sports teams, after the 2018 season.

Conference realignment 

NOTE 1: The Cal State Bakersfield Roadrunners will move from the Western Athletic Conference to the Big West Conference on July 1, 2020.

NOTE 2: The team formerly known as the Fort Wayne Mastodons officially changed its athletic identity to the Purdue Fort Wayne Mastodons on June 18, 2018, shortly before the creation of Purdue University Fort Wayne (PFW). Previously, the PFW athletic program represented Indiana University – Purdue University Fort Wayne (IPFW), but the Indiana University and Purdue University systems agreed to dissolve IPFW on July 1, 2018, with each system establishing a separate Fort Wayne campus. The IPFW athletic program transferred to PFW, representing only that institution, and remains a member of Division I and the Summit League.

NOTE 3: After six years of divisional play, with home-and-home series within the divisions, the Big West Conference teams will be playing a single, eight-team, seven game schedule. This move comes two years before Cal State Bakersfield moves in to make the Big West a nine team league.

NOTE 4: Central Arkansas announced on September 6 that its men's soccer program would leave its associate membership in the Missouri Valley Conference after the 2018 season and join the Sun Belt Conference as an Associate Member.

Season overview

Pre-season polls

Regular season 
The regular season began on August 24, 2018 and ended in early November 2018.

Headlines
 October 3 – Long Island University announced that its two current athletic programs—the Division I LIU Brooklyn Blackbirds and the Division II LIU Post Pioneers—would merge into a single Division I athletic program under the LIU name after the 2018–19 school year. The unified program, which will maintain LIU Brooklyn's Division I and Northeast Conference memberships, will announce a new nickname at a later date. With both campuses sponsoring men's soccer, the two teams will become a single LIU team based at the Post campus in Nassau County, New York in the 2019 season.

#1

Conference standings

Major upsets 
In this list, a "major upset" is defined as a game won by a team ranked 10 or more spots lower or an unranked team that defeats a team ranked #15 or higher.

All rankings are from the United Soccer Coaches Poll.

Early season tournaments 
Several universities hosted early season soccer tournaments.

TopDrawer Soccer Team of the week 
 Bold denotes TDS player of the week.

Postseason

Conference winners and tournaments 

† = A & C denote the Atlantic and Coastal divisions of the ACC.

Postseason awards

Hermann Trophy 

 The Hermann Trophy is given to the year's most outstanding player. Finalists:
 Andrew Gutman (DF), Indiana
 Andre Shinyashiki (FW), Denver
 J. J. Williams (FW), Kentucky

TDS National Player of the Year 

 The TopDrawerSoccer.com National Player of the Year Award recognizes the top college soccer player in the nation by the TDS staff. Finalists:
 Andrew Gutman (DF), Indiana
 Donovan Pines (DF), Maryland
 Andre Shinyashiki (FW), Denver
 J. J. Williams (FW), Kentucky

Senior CLASS Award 

 The Senior CLASS Award is presented each year to the most outstanding senior in NCAA Division I. Finalists:
 Andre Shinyashiki (FW), Denver
 Ryder Bell (FW), William & Mary
 Alex Comsia (DF), North Carolina
 Brad Dunwell (MF), Wake Forest
 Mark Forrest (FW), Lehigh
 DeJuan Jones (FW), Michigan State
 Daniel Krutzen (DF), Albany
 Robbie Mertz (MF), Michigan
 Callum Montgomery (DF), Charlotte
 Tate Schmitt (FW), Louisville

All-Americans

On December 6, 2018; United Soccer Coaches announced the All-America teams for the 2018 season.

Conference player and coaches of the year

Final rankings

Statistics

Individuals
Last update on  12/10Last update on  12/10

Last update on  12/10Last update on  12/10

Last update on 12/10Last update on 12/10
 Individual statistics are through the games of December 9, 2018

Teams
Last update on 12/13Last update on 12/13

Last update on 12/13

Team statistics are through the games of  December 9, 2018Last update on 12/13

See also 
 College soccer
 List of NCAA Division I men's soccer programs
 2018 in American soccer
 2018 NCAA Division I Men's Soccer Championship
 2018 NCAA Division I women's soccer season
 2018 U.S. Soccer Spring Men's College Program
 2019 MLS SuperDraft

Footnotes

References 

 
NCAA